The 2018 D.C. United season was D.C. United's 23rd season of existence, and their 23rd in Major League Soccer, the top flight of American soccer.

The 2018 season was the club's first season playing at Audi Field following a 22-year tenure at RFK Memorial Stadium. Prior to the midseason opening of Audi Field, United played four home matches at alternative venues: three at the Maryland SoccerPlex in Germantown, Maryland (one league match and two cup matches), and one league match at the Navy–Marine Corps Memorial Stadium.

Background

Review

Off season
D.C. United began the off-season trying to figure out how to replace long-time mainstay Bill Hamid, and try to build a much stronger defense in front of his replacement. The team did have the third slot in the 2018 MLS SuperDraft, but elected to deal the selection for allocation money. The team sent allocation money to New York City F.C. to acquire centerback Frédéric Brillant and allocation money to Seattle Sounders F.C. to acquire reserve fullback Oniel Fisher. The team also acquired Costa Rican fullback Joseph Mora. They traded for Vancouver Whitecaps F.C. keeper David Ousted. however, the team also had to find more consistent offensive production. They traded for under-used speedy Jamaican striker, Darren Mattocks and acquired another Costa Rican, midfielder Ulises Segura. The team also sought to bolster the central midfield, acquiring young Venezuelan deep-lying central midfielder Júnior Moreno. The biggest move of the off-season was to deal for Atlanta United F.C.'s attacking star Yamil Asad.

Early season
D.C. United began their most consequential season in years, with the longest road trip in team history. Twelve of the first fourteen games were on the road, as the team awaited the completion and opening of their new Buzzard Point stadium, to be called Audi Field. It was a rough start. The team opened with a hopeful draw in Orlando, including a goal by Asad, but that was followed by a 3–1 loss in Atlanta. The D.C. side than played their first regular season home game at the Maryland Soccerplex in Germantown, Maryland. The intimate setting and snowy weather made for a unique experience, but the team continued its struggles, surrendering two first-half goals. A thrilling rally, however, netted goals by Luciano Acosta and Darren Mattocks and a hard-won point. D.C. only had the two points from the two draws in five matches in March, and then lost again in Kansas City to open April. They returned to the D.C. area to play a home game at the Navy Memorial Stadium in Annapolis, Maryland. Despite scoring in the first minute. United handed the visitors a man advantage when Paul Arriola was shown a red card early in the second half. D.C. had to weather a furious assault by Columbus Crew. Thanks to heroic goalkeeping by Steve Clark, the team hung on for its first win of the year, 1–0.

The long road trip resumed, and so did the losing, with a pair of 3–2 defeats at the hands of Philadelphia Union and Real Salt Lake. D.C. finally won a game on the road, defeating the lowly San Jose Earthquakes by a 3–1 scoreline. The team seemed to be showing progress and earned a 1–1 draw in their first trip to Los Angeles to face potent expansion side LAFC. A 2–1 loss to Seattle followed as the team failed to defend a 1–0 lead after Mattocks had put the team ahead early in the second half. The pattern repeated in a trip to Toronto to face the defending league champions. D.C. actually took a 3–0 lead, which they surrendered over the course of the second half. Still a goal by Acosta in stoppage time seemed to have gained a stunning three points, but Toronto F.C. again rallied with a fourth, tying goal before the final whistle.

As fans of the team looked forward to the opening of the long-awaited, new stadium, speculation intensified that the team would make its biggest signing ever, bringing in English star Wayne Rooney. His signing was announced as June drew to a close. The road trip ended with yet another 3–2 loss, to New England Revolution and yet another draw in Los Angeles, this time a 2–2 affair against LA Galaxy.

Mid-season and a New Home
The new stadium, Audi Field, opened on July 14 in front of a sell-out crowd. A goal by Asad, assisted by Zoltan Stieber gave the team its first ever goal and first lead in the new stadium. Wayne Rooney came on as a substitute in the 58th minute, to a roaring ovation, and he immediately raised the team's level. 2 more goals followed, both by Arriola, the last giving Rooney his first assist in his first Major League Soccer match. However, a giveaway in stoppage time led to a goal by Vancouver's teenage sensation Alphonso Davies, spoiling Ousted's bid for his first clean sheet of the season.

Rooney got his first start in Atlanta, but he looked out of shape and the team failed to protect an early lead, finally losing by a familiar 3–1 scoreline in Atlanta. New York Red Bulls spoiled the second match at Audi Field, as Bradley Wright-Phillips put the visitors on top with a second-minute goal, a lead they never surrendered, despite an uncalled penalty shout for Rooney in the second half. Results did start to come though, for D.C, as they won their next four games at home, and managed a draw in Montreal. Included in that stretch was a 3–2 win over a short-handed Orlando City S.C. side, as Lucho Acosta scored a hat-trick. For all of Acosta's heroics, though, the name on everyone's lips at the end of the game was Wayne Rooney. Deep in stoppage time, United lined up a corner kick and goalkeeper Ousted pushed forward to try to get the winning goal, to break the 2–2 tie. Orlando gained possession and tried to break out of their end quickly to attack the undefended D.C end and get the winning goal themselves. Rooney ran back as the one defender who had a chance to stop the Orlando breakaway. He wasn't able to beat Wil Johnson to the ball as it rolled past midfield, but Rooney dispossessed Johnson with a sliding tackle. Rooney then rose and dribbled back in the opposite direction before a sending a long pass across the field, into the box, where Acosta was able to head it for the winning goal at the death. The post-game discussion was whether Rooney's effort was the greatest play in league history.

That thrilling finish was followed by the return of Bill Hamid to the D.C. United goalkeeper role. Hamid had struggled in Denmark and was anxious to return to the D.C. United fold. Hamid's return was marked by a pair of solid wins, 4–1 over Portland Timbers on the strength of a brace by Rooney that included his first free kick goal, and a 2–0 over New England. But the team then took some steps backward with a hard-fought 1–0 loss to the Red Bulls on a hot Sunday night on the road, followed by a tired, sluggish effort in a midweek 2–0 home loss to Philadelphia. D.C rebounded, though, with a 3–1 thumping of the league leaders, Atlanta United F.C., a road draw in Yankee Stadium against NYCFC, another home win as the team rallied to beat Minnesota United 2–1. That was followed by a thrilling rematch at home against the Red Bulls, D.C. took the lead three times on goals by Arriola, Rooney and Acosta, but each time they surrendered the lead on a goal by Wright-Phillips. The 3–3 draw temporarily left D.C. United 4 points off the pace for the final playoff spot, but with a game in hand over Montreal Impact, whom they would play in their next home match, to close out September.

A sell-out crowd watched D.C. United host the Montreal Impact in a crucial match in the race or the final playoff spot in the Eastern Conference. Lucho Acosta got the home side off to a good start with an impressive finish to beat the Impact 'keeper to the far post in the 17th minute. United seemed to back off after that, as the Impact pressed for much of the rest of the first half. United barely clung to the 1–0 lead at halftime, giving no hint of the explosive second half to come. Early in the second half, Acosta got the ball to Rooney, who picked his way towards the box before blistering a shot to beat the goalie at the near post. In the 61st minute, Acosta got his second assist of the game, as Rooney sent Acosta in through the Montreal defense, and Acosta then crossed the ball for Arriola to poke it for the third goal. In the 78th minute D.C. stretched its lead to 4–0 as Arriola beat the goalie to a loose ball and scored his second of the match, and giving Acosta his 3rd assist. 3 minutes later, Rooney capped off a 5–0 thrashing of Montreal, as a clearance by the Impact goalie came to Rooney. Even from 40 yards out, Rooney had little trouble scoring on an empty net. The final result was the most convincing scoreline for D.C. since a 5–0 win over New England Revolution in 2001. In the playoff chase, D.C. still trailed Montreal by 2 points, but now had 2 games in hand to make up those points, and no team was playing in better form than D.C. United. All the good feeling was a little tempered by the news later that starting right back Oniel Fisher had suffered a season-ending knee injury, but the team seemed to be in good position heading into the final month of the regular season calendar.

Close of the regular season
The final month of the regular season, October, opened with Montreal posting a 3–0 win over Columbus and Philadelphia an even bigger winner over Minnesota. The pressure was on D.C. United to win to keep on the Impact's heel for the last playoff position. Hosting Chicago Fire, D.C got off to a good start but squandered several chances in the first half, including an apparent Rooney goal, waved off for a foul after a video review. When Chicago scored in the 51st minute, it looked as if D.C. would have a long team to rue missed chances. However, in the 62nd minute, Arriola, starting at right back, sent a shot in on goal. Rooney scored on the rebound and later added a second goal to claim all 3 points with a successful Penalty Kick in the 81st minute. No ground gained in the playoff chase in this round, but D.C. knew it still controlled its own fate. D.C. would play two home matches before Montreal would again take the field, and a win in either match would put D.C. on top of Montreal in the table.

The 2018 MLS season continued even through an international break, with D.C. United playing with a very short bench, thanks to a combination of injuries, international call-ups and a pair of tragic items that struck the team in short order. Paul Arriola had been slotted to start at right back following Fisher's season-ending knee surgery, but the news of the sudden death of Arriola's father meant he was unavailable for the team's two games in over the international break. It was also announced that another potential option at right back, Chris Odoi-Atsem would undergo treatment for non-Hodgkin's lymphoma. The return of Nick DeLeon from the injured list could not have been more timely.

United managed two straight 1–0 wins at home. The first came against the Western Conference leaders F.C. Dallas. United squandered some chances and seemed destined to settle for a draw, dropping two much needed points in the playoff chase. However, in the 86th minute Russell Canouse scored his first ever MLS goal, with a header that finished off a scramble following a Canouse shot that came back off the post. In a midweek match against the defending champions, Toronto F.C., United did the deed early on when Wayne Rooney scored a memorable goal on a 40-yard free kick that curled back just inside the post. That left the team needing only 3 points in its final two games to secure a playoff spot that seemed impossible 3 months earlier, when Rooney signed with the team.

D.C. United clinched their place in the 2018 MLS Cup Playoffs in style, rounding out their 2018 home regular season campaign with a convincing win over visiting NYCFC, extending the team's unbeaten streak to nine games. The first came when Acosta went on a run from the sideline maneuvering through several defenders before cutting the ball to Rooney for a simple tap-in at the top of the six-yard box. Acosta got the honors on the second goal, as Rooney lost control of the ball about 20 yards out and Acosta stepped up and one-timed a curling shot into the corner of the NYC goal. A second-half penalty kick by Rooney extended the lead to 3–0. A late goal by David Villa ruined the clean sheet, but the final 3–1 result put D.C. in the playoffs, with a chance to claim the 4th spot in the table with a road win or draw at Chicago in the final week. D.C. was unable to score against Chicago Fire, but a 0–0 was enough to put D.C. ahead of Philadelphia into 4th place, and earned a home game in the one-game opening playoff round, against the Columbus Crew.

MLS Playoffs
Playing in front of one of the most raucous home crowds in team history, D.C. United took a 1–0 lead in the first half, when Brillant pounced on a loose ball in the box, heading it for a goal after a misplay by the Columbus Crew goalie Zack Steffen. However, a pair of defensive errors allowed Columbus to equalize before halftime. Thanks to spectacular saves by each goalie, the game remained even and went into an overtime period. Columbus went ahead early in the first overtime on a header by Federico Higuaín, his second goal of the game. D.C.'s season seemed to have been rescued when Nick DeLeon scored on a volley in the 118th minute, the latest goal in a game in team history. However, in a penalty kick shootout, Steffen saved shots from both of D.C.'s top guns, Rooney and Acosta. Hamid also saved one shot and forced former D.C. striker Patrick Mullins to hit the post with his effort. Shooting in the fifth spot, DeLeon put his shot over the crossbar, giving the Crew a 3–2 winning margin in the shootout, ending D.C. United's season.

Club

First team roster

Team management

Transfers

In

Draft picks 
Draft picks are not automatically signed to the team roster. Only trades involving draft picks and executed after the start of 2018 MLS SuperDraft will be listed in the notes. Pending any trades up to the draft, United had six selections in the SuperDraft.

Notes: D.C. United traded their first round pick (third selection overall) to Los Angeles FC for $100,000 in General Allocation Money (GAM) and $100,000 in Targeted Allocation Money (TAM).

Out

Non-competitive

Preseason friendlies

Midseason friendlies

Competitive

Major League Soccer

Standings

Overall

Eastern Conference

Results

MLS Cup Playoffs

Preliminary round

U.S. Open Cup

Player statistics

Most goals
The list is sorted by shirt number when total goals are equal.

Most assists 
Players in italics left the club during the season.

Awards

MLS Player of the Week

MLS Goal of the Week

MLS Team of the Week

See also 
2018 Richmond Kickers season

References 

D.C. United seasons
Dc United
Dc United
2018 in sports in Washington, D.C.